Anne Macnaghten, CBE (9 August 1908 – 31 December 2000) was a British classical violinist and pedagogue.

Anne was the youngest daughter of high court judge Sir Malcolm Macnaghten and grew up in Northern Ireland and Kensington, London.  She began her violin studies at the age of six with Hungarian soloist Jelly d'Arányi.  Macnaghten later stated in an interview with The Strad that d'Arányi "wasn't really a very good teacher".  At the age of seventeen she travelled to Germany to study at Leipzig Conservatory (now University of Music and Theatre Leipzig) with German pedagogue Walther Davisson, who later became the director of the conservatory.

In 1931 she co-founded the Macnaghten Concerts together with composer Elisabeth Lutyens and conductor Iris Lemare, which aimed to promote contemporary classical composers. The concert series was based at the Mercury Theatre, Notting Hill Gate and originally ran from 1931–1937.

In the same year Macnaghten founded the (then all-female) Macnaghten String Quartet, which played in many of the series' concerts. The quartet consisted of Macnaghtan, Joan Wordsell, Violet Brough and Joan Bonner. By 1932 the personnel had changed to Macnaghten, Elise Deprez, Beryl Scawen-Blunt and Mary Goodchild. The quartet premièred works of several well-known composers as part of the concert series, including Sinfonietta, Op. 1 by Benjamin Britten in 1933, Tippet's String Quartet No. 1 in 1935, the String Quartet No 3 by Mary Lucas and works by Gerald Finzi, Elizabeth Maconchy, and Alan Rawsthorne. The Macnaghten String Quartet are still an active quartet and regularly coach chamber music at Benslow Music Trust.

In 1952, with the help of composer Ralph Vaughan Williams (a strong supporter of the original concert series) and funding from the Arts Council of Great Britain (now Arts Council England), Macnaghten was able to revive the concert series, which was renamed the New Macnaghten Concerts and ran for over forty years, the last concert given in 1994. The New Macnaghten Concerts saw the première of works by British composers such as Harrison Birtwhistle and Richard Rodney Bennett.

The recital series saw performances by some of the most internationally renowned musicians of the era, including John Williams, Cecil Aronowitz, Peter Pears, Steve Reich, Michael Nyman, Derek Simpson, Thea King and many others.

From the late 1970s onwards, she taught violin in Hertfordshire, stopping only as a result of a fall aged ninety.

Macnaghten received a Gold Medal from the Worshipful Company of Musicians in 1962, and in 1987 was appointed a CBE in recognition of her work in taking the Macnaghten Quartet into schools in Ealing, Cambridgeshire and particularly Hertfordshire.

References

British classical violinists
Commanders of the Order of the British Empire
1908 births
2000 deaths
20th-century classical violinists
20th-century British musicians
Women classical violinists
20th-century women musicians
People from Kensington